Coronita de Flores (English: flower crown) is the fifth single of Juan Luis Guerra sixth studio album Areito, released in 1993 by Karem Records. The song was written band produced by Juan Luis Guerra. The track received positive reviews due the musical structure of cha-cha and Bolero and was nominated for Tropical/Salsa Song of the Year at the 1994's Lo Nuestro Awards.

The song was a recipient of a Broadcast Music, Inc. (BMI) Latin Award in 1995. The song was a commercial success peaked at number 4 on US Billboard Hot Latin Tracks and Latin American Airplay Charts. The track was included on Guerra's compilation album Colección Romantica (2001).

Track listing 

 Spain CD-Single (1993)
 Coronita De Flores – 4:17
 El Costo De La Vida – 4:10

Charts

References 

1993 singles
1993 songs
Juan Luis Guerra songs
Songs written by Juan Luis Guerra